1–3 is the debut album of Supersilent, released on January 12, 1998, through Rune Grammofon.

Track listing

Personnel 
Supersilent
 Arve Henriksen – trumpet, live electronics
 Helge Sten – live electronics, production, mixing, recording
 Ståle Storløkken – keyboards
 Jarle Vespestad – drums
Production and additional personnel
 Kai Ø. Andersen – recording
 Ellen Ane Eggen – photography
 Audun Strype – mastering

References

External links 
 

1998 debut albums
Supersilent albums